Barbara Fanny Wylie (1862–1954) was a British suffragette. In 1909  she joined the Women's Society and Political Union (WSPU). In 1910 joined the Glasgow, Scotland, branch of WSPU as an activist and organizer. Wylie was best known for her passion within the fight for women's rights, especially the rights to vote and have equality to men.

Early life 
Barbara Franny Wylie was born in 1861 in Shrewsbury, Shropshire, England.

Family 
Wylie has three sisters and one brother. Emma Wylie born in 1855 Shrewsbury, Shropshire, England, and a brother David James Wylie born 1859 in Shrewsbury, Shropshire England. Her brother David got his civil engineering degree from Cheltenham College, in 1880 he immigrated to Canada, where he finally settled down in Saskatchewan and became representative in the political party called at the time, Provincial Rghts Party, from 1905 to 1917.

All the Wylie sisters were a part British women's movement.

Women's Social and Political Union – WSPU 
The Women's Social and Political Union was founded by Emmeline Pankhurst in 1903. The WSPU's agenda was one thing and that was to achieve equal franchise for women. The WSPU was known for is militant politics in 1906 were labeled suffragettes.  The women of the WSPU were not afraid to use violence, go against the law, break windows, rebel against the political leaders as well as spend time in jail. Wylie was a part of the Glasgow branch which was formed March 1906 and she joined in 1909 by 1910 was assigned as organizer, however, in 1913 resigned when Sylvia Pankhurst took over as honorary secretary. Wylie was very much a part of the militant actions and engaged in many social settings where she gave speeches and rallied marches, in order to get the parties message out there. Wylie was a close friend and ally with Emmeline Pankhurst within the suffrage movement. There were many times Wylie was there to support Pankhurst during her time with the WSPU, including on 22 May 1914 she was acting as a bodyguard to protect Pankhurst from being arrested at St. Andrew's Hall, Glasgow, which ended with Wylie being hurt and arrested. 22 June 1914 Wylie was arrested again outside Hist Majesty's Theatre. Wylie's home was also considered a safe haven, nicknamed “the mouse hole” that Pankhurst used when she was hiding from the police. Pankhurst passed away 14 June 1928 and Wylie was one of her pallbearers.  

On 25 July 1910 Wylie was a speaker at Calton hill Edinburgh delivering a synchronized speech that was also being delivered in London about the passing of the women's suffrage bill in its second reading, along with a plea to Parliament to allow the bill to pass into law. 16 July 1912 votes for equal rights was passed with this news being presented by the WSPU representatives Barbara and Dr. Mary Murdoch at a meeting held at the Crown Hotel 

10 August 1912 Wylie was a part of an open-air meeting that addressed the injustice women were facing due to their lack of ability to vote, supported by the fact that women were already, in fact, apart of politics as well as working and supporting themselves, but without a voice.

Canada tour – 1912 
Wylie went to Canada in 1912 on a speaking tour. The women's rights and reform of Canada asked for their sister branch of the WPSU to speak across the country to bolster and unit the suffragists’ branches within Canada, and to strengthen the position of the women in Canada, offer them support and according to Wylie, if all else fails to instill militant action in order to make change happen.  Wylie initially was not welcomed to Canada due to her reputation and was warned that if she started any riots while in Canada that she would be deported immediately, as the suffragists in Canada did not display the same type of militant force as the WSPU.  However, this wound not stop Wylie, and she indicated that she would come to Canada by airplane if she had to.  

Before her departure, Wylie met with Premier Borden of Canada in London. She laid a foundation for why the WSPU was coming to Canada, in the hope that he would show full support women's rights.  She had a single major goal during her tour, to move Canadian women from passivity to demands to be heard. The tour started in Quebec. On 4 November 1912, she was in Montreal, Quebec, giving a speech with Emmeline Pankhurst, Sylvia Pankhurst, Forbes Robertson Hale, and urging the women who attended to stand up for rights and freedoms and voice a stance for change.

Pankhurst felt that Wylie had an advantage of a brother, David Wylie, was part of the Province of Saskatchewan Conservative government. David Wylie, however, was not a supporter of the women's movement until 1917. Another Conservative member Albert Bradshaw took Wylie's initiative to the legislature.  

On 3 April 1913, Calgary, Alberta – Wylie gave a speech that became the speech she was known for and also became a slogan for the WPSU  “Abandon ladylike constitutional methods. Don’t be docile, don’t be ladylike. Don’t dread being conspicuous. Now is the time for deeds, not words". As well during Wylie speech, she used descriptive language and implications that the women have not been standing up for themselves and that it was imperative that these women needed to start taking action and by any means possible, yet the women of Calgary did not take to that implications too lightly.

See also 
 List of suffragists and suffragettes

References

External links 
The National Women's Social and Political Union Annual Reports 1908-1912 https://discovery.nationalarchives.gov.uk/results/r?_q=Barbara+Wylie&_sd=&_ed=&_hb=

Wikipedia Student Program
1862 births
1954 deaths
British women activists
Women's Social and Political Union
Politicians from Shrewsbury
English suffragettes